Higaonon is a Manobo language spoken on the island of Mindanao in the Philippines. It is partially (80%) intelligible with Binukid.

Higaonon is spoken in the Butuan River basin of north-central Mindanao, comprising northwestern Agusan del Sur Province and the area of Agusan del Norte Province south of Butuan. According to Ethnologue, it is closely related to Binukid, with 77%–81% mutual intelligibility.

References

Manobo languages
Languages of Bukidnon
Languages of Misamis Oriental
Languages of Agusan del Sur
Languages of Lanao del Norte